Wang Pu (王溥) (922–982) was a chancellor of imperial China's Later Zhou and Song Dynasty.

He also wrote the important historiographical books Tang Huiyao and Wudai Huiyao after his retirement.

Notes and references

Sources
 
  
  
  

Later Zhou chancellors
Later Han (Five Dynasties) people
Song dynasty chancellors
10th-century births
982 deaths
Year of birth uncertain